Jajjal is a town and Union Council of Kasur District in the Punjab province of Pakistan. It is part of Chunian Tehsil and is located atan altitude of 177 metres (583 feet).

References

Kasur District